Mario Albertini (1885–?) was an Italian swimmer and rower.

Albertini was born in 1885 in Pavia, Italy. He was a swimmer starting for Rari Nantes Pavia and between 1902 and 1906, he gained nine Italian national titles. He competed at the 1906 Intercalated Games in Athens. In the 100 m freestyle, he was eliminated in the heats. In the 1 mile freestyle, he did not finish his heat.

He was a rower for Battellieri Cristoforo Colombo and at the 1907 European Rowing Championships in Strasbourg he won a silver medal in the coxed four.

References

1885 births
Year of death missing
Italian male freestyle swimmers
Italian male rowers
Swimmers at the 1906 Intercalated Games
Sportspeople from Pavia
European Rowing Championships medalists